Lake Yankton is a lake in Lyon County, in the U.S. state of Minnesota.

Lake Yankton was named for the Yankton Dakota.

References

Lakes of Minnesota
Lakes of Lyon County, Minnesota